Cecil Victor Shadbolt (1859 – 8 July 1892) was a British photographer, who pioneered aerial photography from flying balloons.

Life 

Shadbolt was born in 1859, the son of the mahogany dealer and photographer George Shadbolt.

He showed photographs of Welsh landscapes at the 1877 Photographic Society exhibition.

His first balloon ascent was in  May 1882, at Alexandra Palace. He made his own device for attaching a camera to the basket below a balloon, allowing him to take pictures looking directly downwards. A print of the same image, An Instantaneous Map Photograph taken from the Car of a Balloon, 2,000 feet high, was shown at the 1882 Photographic Society exhibition.

Shadbolt gave public lectures, using magic lantern slides, with the title Balloons and Ballooning, Upward and Onwards.

He was secretary of the West Kent Sunday School Union from 1886.

Death 

On 29 June 1892, he took a flight in a gas balloon owned by (or which he co-owned with; sources vary) his friend 'Captain' William D. Dale, at Crystal Palace. Shadbolt and the other passengers were taken to Norwood Cottage Hospital, but Shadbolt died on 8 July, aged 33. He was buried, alongside members of his family, in grave 1,932, square 113, at West Norwood Cemetery. His father was later buried in the adjacent plot.

An inquest at the hospital, on 12 July 1892, under coroner, Mr Jackson, returned verdicts of accidental death.

Shadbolt Collection 

The Shadbolt Collection of 76 glass lantern slides taken between 1882 and 1892 is held by Historic England, The slides were found at a car boot sale and subsequently purchased at auction by Historic England in 2015.

Publications 

  – includes 24 photogravures by Shadbolt
An 1894 edition was subtitled "With a Portrait and Brief Memoir of the Late Cecil V. Shadbolt".

References

Further reading 

 report, Illustrated London News, 9 July 1892
 report, Blackheath Gazette, 15 July 1892

1859 births
1892 deaths
Accidental deaths from falls
Accidental deaths in London
Victims of aviation accidents or incidents in 1892
Victims of aviation accidents or incidents in England
19th-century British photographers
Photographers from London